A round of regional elections in Italy took place during 2014 in five regions out of twenty including Sardinia (16 February), Piedmont and Abruzzo (25 May), Emilia-Romagna and Calabria (23 November).

Overall results

Results by region

Sardinia

Abruzzo

Piedmont

Calabria

Emilia-Romagna

External links

Elections in Italian regions
2014 elections in Italy
February 2014 events in Italy
May 2014 events in Italy
November 2014 events in Italy